Help Us Get Married is an American reality series that premiered on May 3, 2018 on Facebook Watch. The series is hosted by Tamera Mowry-Housley and follows three couples who are trying to plan their weddings with the help of the Facebook community.

Premise
Help Us Get Married features "three newly engaged couples from across America who are planning their weddings with the help of the Facebook community."

On Thursday nights, pre-filmed episodes document the arguments and disagreements the couples have regarding their weddings and allow viewers the opportunity to vote in polls to help them solve their issues. Then on Friday nights, the results of the previous nights polling are revealed. Decisions the audience help to make include deciding on the venue and picking the perfect dress. In the season finale, the audience will get to see the weddings they helped plan.

Production

Development
On April 27, 2018, it was announced that Facebook had ordered a first season of the series with a premiere date set for May 3, 2018. Executive producers were reported to consist of Rhett Bachner, Brien Meagher, and Richard Courtneyk. Production companies involved with the series were set to include Thumb Candy Media.

Episodes

Release

Marketing
Alongside the series announcement, Facebook released the first official trailer for the series.

See also
 List of original programs distributed by Facebook Watch

References

External links
 

Facebook Watch original programming
2010s American reality television series
2018 American television series debuts
2018 American television series endings
English-language television shows
American non-fiction web series